Emil Riis Jakobsen (born 24 June 1998) is a Danish professional footballer who plays as a forward for  club Preston North End.

Club career

Early years
Riis joined the youth academy of Randers at the age of 14. He went on to become the top-scorer of the under-17 team by scoring 24 goals in the youth league. After two trials, he joined the youth team of English club Derby County in July 2015. After joining the club, he was assigned to the under-18 team. He further progressed on to play for the under-23 team and scored 11 goals as his side gained the Premier League 2 Division 1  status.

In December 2017, Riis trialled with Dutch club VVV-Venlo. On 11 January 2018, he joined the club on a loan deal till the end of the season. He made his debut on 17 March 2018, where he came on as a 68th minute substitute for Romeo Castelen in a 3–0 away loss to PSV. He made two more appearances in the Eredivisie during the spring.

Randers
On 13 June 2018, it was announced that Riis would return to Randers FC, where he signed a three-year contract. In the 2018–19 season, his first season in the top Danish Superliga, he played regularly, but was not always a starter. During the season, Riis also made appearances for the reserve team. After 19 appearances for the first team, in which he scored three goals, Randers finished in eighth place of the league table during the regular season, and thereby qualified for Group 2 in the relegation round, in which the club made play-offs for European football as group winners. Riis was utilised in all matches and scored the 1–0 winner in a game against Hobro IK. In the play-offs, Randers reached the third and decisive qualifying round, where they eventually lost 4–2 to Brøndby who qualified for UEFA Europa League participation.

In the 2019–20 season, Riis was able to establish himself in the starting lineup. In the regular season, he scored 5 goals in 29 appearances. Randers ended in 7th place and again qualified for the relegation round, in which Riis scored three goals and again helped his club to European play-offs. There, Randers were knocked out by OB (2–1; 0–2).

Preston North End
On 1 October 2020, Riis signed a four-year contract with English Championship club Preston North End for an undisclosed fee, believed to be around DKK 10 million. He scored his first goal for the club in a 3–0 win over Reading on 4 November 2020.

Riis started the 2021–22 season in fine form, scoring five goals in all competitions during August. His goalscoring form continued, scoring 16 goals in all competitions by the end of January 2022, including an audacious 96th minute equalising volley against Bristol City on 29 January 2022, winning further plaudits for his goalscoring ability.

International career
Riis has been capped by the Denmark under-16, under-17 and under-21 team.

He was called up to the senior Denmark squad for the 2022 FIFA World Cup qualification matches against the Faroe Islands and Scotland on 12 and 15 November 2021, respectively. He was on the bench against Scotland.

Career statistics

Club

References

External links

Emil Riis Jakobsen at DBU 

1998 births
Living people
People from Hobro
Association football forwards
Danish men's footballers
Derby County F.C. players
VVV-Venlo players
Randers FC players
Preston North End F.C. players
Eredivisie players
Danish Superliga players
English Football League players
Danish expatriate men's footballers
Expatriate footballers in England
Expatriate footballers in the Netherlands
Danish expatriate sportspeople in England
Danish expatriate sportspeople in the Netherlands
Sportspeople from the North Jutland Region